With the onset of the AIDS epidemic, American television episodes with LGBT themes sometimes featured LGBT characters, especially gay men, as a way for series to address the epidemic. Legal dramas like L.A. Law and Law & Order included euthanasia storylines centered on the deaths of gay men with AIDS. Sitcoms would occasionally broach the subject, but for the most part followed the pattern that had developed during the 1970s, with episodes following one of a handful of plot devices: a character close to a lead character would unexpectedly come out, forcing the characters to confront their own issues with homosexuality; a lead character is mistaken for gay; a lead character pretends to be gay; or, less frequently, a recurring character from the series comes out. In the first instance, it was rare that the gay character would ever make another appearance.

Episodes

See also
 List of pre-Stonewall American television episodes with LGBT themes
 List of 1970s American television episodes with LGBT themes
 List of American television episodes with LGBT themes, 1990–1997
 Lists of television programs with LGBT characters

Notes

References

Episodes with LGBT themes
American television episodes with LGBT themes, 1980s
Television episodes, 1980s
LGBT themes, 1980s
American television episodes, 1980s
1980s LGBT-related mass media
LGBT themes in fiction